A general election was held in the Northern Territory on Saturday June 7, 1980.  It was the first to be held since self-government was attained two years earlier, and was won by the incumbent Country Liberal Party (CLP) under Chief Minister Paul Everingham.

Although the CLP's share of the vote increased by almost 10 percentage points, it lost one seat.

The only independent member of the Legislative Assembly, Dawn Lawrie, retained her seat of Nightcliff.

Results 

|}

Candidates

Sitting members are listed in bold. Successful candidates are highlighted in the relevant colour.

Seats changing hands

References

Elections in the Northern Territory
1980 elections in Australia
1980s in the Northern Territory
June 1980 events in Australia